Österåker Municipality is a municipality in Stockholm County in east central Sweden. Its seat is located in the town of Åkersberga, with a population of 26,727 (2005).

From 1974 to 1982 Österåker was part of Vaxholm Municipality.

Its location by the Stockholm archipelago, in the Roslagen area, attracts both people who settles here, often commuting to Stockholm, and visiting tourists. Österåker boasts several golf courses, many possibilities for canoeing, horse riding, fishing and other nature activities.

Österåker also has a historical significance, with at least three notable castles from the 17th and 18th centuries, with histories tracing even further back. Sweden's once largest quartz mine, the Härsbacka mine, lays within the municipality.

Like many other municipalities making up Metropolitan Stockholm, Österåker has a significant outward-commuting mainly to Stockholm, with some 13,000 commuters.

Geography  
Of the 800 islands and islets, the largest one is Ljusterö, a community of its own covering the eastern side of the mainland, and accessible by car. Easy access is granted by regular ferries, including one old steam ship from 1898. Other major islands are Finnhamn, Husarö and Ingmarsö.

Localities
Rydbo
Skärgårdsstad
Svinninge
Åkersberga (seat)
Österskär

Demography

Population development

Residents with a foreign background
On the 31st of December 2017 the number of people with a foreign background (persons born outside of Sweden or with two parents born outside of Sweden) was 8 916, or 20.20% of the population (44 130 on the 31st of December 2017). On the 31st of December 2002 the number of residents with a foreign background was (per the same definition) 5 079, or 14.25% of the population (35 633 on the 31st of December 2002). On 31 December 2017 there were 44 130 residents in Österåker, of which 7 117 people (16.13%) were born in a country other than Sweden. Divided by country in the table below - the Nordic countries as well as the 12 most common countries of birth outside of Sweden for Swedish residents have been included, with other countries of birth bundled together by continent by Statistics Sweden.

2018 Election
Elections to Swedish municipals are held every fourth year on the third Sunday in September. The 2018 election to the 51-seat council resulted in the centre-right Alliance of four parties (M, L, KD and C) staying in power.

Public transportation
Österåker is served by the Stockholm public transport system through SL. There are six stops on the narrow gauge Roslagsbanan suburban railway and buses to Stockholm and Norrtälje as well as an extensive internal bus network.

References

External links

Österåker Municipality - Official site

 
Municipalities of Stockholm County
Metropolitan Stockholm